

Southern Kangaroo Island Marine Park is a marine protected area in the Australian state of South Australia located in state coastal waters adjoining both the south coast of Kangaroo Island and a group of islets located to the south of Kangaroo Island.

The marine park was established on 29 January 2009 under the Marine Parks Act 2007. 

The marine park consists of two areas of water.

The marine park is divided into zones to manage the marine environment to ensure varying degrees of “protection for habitats and biodiversity” and varying levels of “ecologically sustainable development and use” as follows:
One “restricted access zone” which underlays the full extent of the Seal Bay Aquatic Reserve and part of the Seal Bay Conservation Park.
One “sanctuary zone” that occupies the full extent of the marine park iat its western end and where “the removal or harm of plants, animals or marine products” is prohibited.  It adjoins both the Seal Bay Conservation Park and the Cape Gantheaume Wilderness Protection Area, and overlays the full extent of the Bales Beach Aquatic Reserve.
Two “habitat protection zones” adjoining the remainder of the coastline of Kangaroo Island in the east and the waters around North Rock, Young Rocks and South West Rock, where “activities and uses that do not harm habitats or the functioning of ecosystems” are only permitted.

The portion of the marine park on the coastline of Kangaroo Island is adjoined by the Southern Kangaroo Island Marine Park which is a marine protected area  managed by the Australian government, on its southern side at the limits of state waters.

As of 2016, the marine park has been classified under the IUCN system of protected area categories with the “restricted access zone” being Category Ia, the “sanctuary zone” being IUCN Category II and the “habitat protection zones” being IUCN Category IV.

References

External links
Southern Kangaroo Island Marine Park official webpage

Marine parks of South Australia
IUCN Category II 
IUCN Category IV
Protected areas established in 2009  
2009 establishments in Australia
Protected areas of Kangaroo Island